Cheshmeh Rubah (also Romanized as Cheshmeh Rūbāh and Chashmeh Rūbāh; also known as Chashmeh Rībāt, Cheshmeh Robāţ, and Rūbāh) is a village in Khosrowabad Rural District, Chang Almas District, Bijar County, Kurdistan Province, Iran. At the 2006 census, its population was 237, in 58 families. The village is populated by Kurds.

References 

Towns and villages in Bijar County
Kurdish settlements in Kurdistan Province